TWO MEN AND A TRUCK is an American franchised moving company, headquartered in Lansing, Michigan, with franchises in 46 U.S. states, as well as the United Kingdom, Canada, and Ireland. The company is the largest franchised moving company in the United States with more than 350 franchised locations worldwide.

History
The company was founded in the early 1980s by two Lansing brothers, Brig and Jon Sorber. Using an old '66 Ford pickup truck, they performed moves to earn extra spending money. Their mother, Mary Ellen Sheets, drew the logo for their new company and that stick-figure logo still represents Two Men and a Truck today. Sheets took over the business when her sons left for college. In 1985, she purchased a  truck for $350 and hired a pair of movers. This is the only money Sheets personally invested in the company. A fellow panelist at a university business seminar in 1988 suggested Sheets consider franchising. After further research, the first franchise was awarded in 1989.

Franchising

The initial franchise fee is $50,000; there is also an ongoing royalty of 6% of revenue. As of 2021, there are 292 franchises in the United States, 28 in Canada, and 2 in the UK and Ireland. 

Initial investment: Mini-market start-up costs typically run between $100k and $192k and standard market start-up costs run between $179k and $585k depending on several variables including authority fees which vary by state, store location and trucks. 

Net worth requirements: Mini market minimum requirements are $80,000 in liquid assets and $160,000 in net worth. Standard marketing area capital requirement is $150,000 in liquid assets and $400,000 in net worth.

References

Further reading
 Foundations of Business. Cengage Learning. 
 The Oxford Handbook of Positive Organizational Scholarship. Oxford University Press. pp. 458– . 
 Basic Guide to Exporting. Government Printing Office. pp. 106–107.
 Becoming a Trustworthy Leader: Psychology and Practice. Routledge. pp. 165–166.
 Small Business Management. Cengage Learning. pp. 651– . 
 Service Operations Management. Edward Elgar Publishing. p. 193.

External links

 Two Men And A Truck USA
 Two Men And A Truck UK
 Two Men And A Truck Ireland 
 Two Men And A Truck Canada

Companies based in Lansing, Michigan
Transport companies established in 1985
Moving companies of the United States
Franchises
1985 establishments in Michigan